Sanjay Shukla is a member of Madhya Pradesh legislative Assembly. He was elected in the year 2018 from Indore 1 constituency. Shukla is from Indian National Congress Party. As a warning to the administration, he claimed to set himself on fire if the COVID-19 situation didn't improve.

Shukla was also nominated for the position of Mayor of Indore city by Indian National Congress.

External links 

 Official Twitter Handle

References 

Living people
Indian National Congress politicians from Assam
1973 births